To Live Again can refer to:

To Live Again (album), by Tarot, 2004
To Live Again (film), a 1963 short documentary film
To Live Again (1998 film), a TV film starring Bonnie Bedelia, Annabeth Gish, and Timothy Carhart
To Live Again (novel), a 1969 science fiction novel by Robert Silverberg
To Live Again , a 2001 novel by Lurlene McDaniel

See also
To Love Again (disambiguation)
"Learning to Live Again", a song